Kristy Yang (born 7 January 1974), also known as Yang Gongru, is a Chinese-born Canadian actress based in Hong Kong.

Early life
Yang was born in Shanghai, China, to a Chinese father and Jenny Liu, a half American-half Chinese. Ms.Liu was invited to play the role in the film Shanghai 1976 (2008) and she has just known her father was an American soldier. Ms.Liu's mother had just a photo of him but in the end it's also burned in war.

Kristy grew up in a single-family as her father left the family during her childhood. In 1985, Yang immigrated to Toronto, Ontario, Canada. She has a step-brother who was born in Canada.

Kristy graduated from York University after completing her high school education in 1993 at Rosedale Heights School of the Arts in Toronto.

Career
In the summer of 1995, during a trip to Hong Kong, Yang participated in the Miss Asia Pageant beauty contest organised by ATV and earned the title of "Miss Asia 1995". She also won the Miss Photogenic and Most Popular Contestant awards. Yang joined ATV and had been acting in several television dramas produced by ATV before venturing into the film industry.

Filmography

Film

Television

References

External links
Official Web Site
Official Sina blog of Kristy Yang

Kristy Yang at the Hong Kong Movie DataBase

Chinese emigrants to Canada
1974 births
Living people
Hong Kong television actresses
20th-century Chinese actresses
21st-century Chinese actresses
20th-century Canadian actresses
21st-century Canadian actresses
Hong Kong film actresses
Actresses from Shanghai
York University alumni
Participants in Chinese reality television series
Chinese film actresses
Chinese television actresses
20th-century Hong Kong actresses
21st-century Hong Kong actresses